Fasciolaria bullisi is a species of sea snail, a marine gastropod mollusk in the family Fasciolariidae, the spindle snails, the tulip snails and their allies.

Description
The species attains a size of 160 mm.

Distribution
Sometimes trawled at 300 ft. depths, off the East coast of Mexico.

References

External links

Fasciolariidae
Gastropods described in 1972